Primera División de México (Mexican First Division) Clausura 2004 is a Mexican football tournament - one of two short tournaments that take up the entire year to determine the champion(s) of Mexican football. It began on Saturday, January 17, 2004, and ran until May 15, when the regular season ended. On June 13, UNAM defeated Guadalajara in penalty kicks and became champions for the fourth time.

Overview

Final standings (groups)

League table

Results

Top goalscorers 
Players sorted first by goals scored, then by last name. Only regular season goals listed.

Source: MedioTiempo

Playoffs

Repechage

Cruz Azul won 4–1 on aggregate.

Bracket

Quarterfinals

UNAM won 5–2 on aggregate.

Cruz Azul won 4–3 on aggregate.

3–3 on aggregate. Guadalajara advanced for being the higher seeded team.

Toluca won 4–2 on aggregate.

Semifinals

UNAM won 3–2 on aggregate.

Guadalajara won 2–1 on aggregate.

Finals

1–1 on aggregate. UNAM won 5–4 on penalty kicks.

Relegation

References

External links
 Mediotiempo.com (where information was obtained)

Mexico
Clausura